The Gosau Group (German: Gosau-Gruppe) is a geological stratigraphic group in Austria, Germany and western Slovakia whose strata date back to the Late Cretaceous to Eocene. It is exposed in numerous sporadic isolated basins within the Northern Calcareous Alps. It is divided into two subgroups, the Lower Gosau Subgroup which dates from the Turonian to Campanian, approximately 90 to 75 Ma and the Upper Gosau Subgroup which dates to the Santonian to Eocene, about 83.5 to 50 Ma. The formations within each subunit vary significantly between basins. The sequence is largely marine, but the Grünbach Formation represents a terrestrial deposit. Many of the units of the group are fossiliferous, typically providing marine fossils such as ammonites, though terrestrial remains including those of dinosaurs are known from the Grünbach Formation and Schönleiten Formation.

Fossil content 
Among others, the following fossils have been described from the Gosau Group:

See also 
 List of dinosaur-bearing rock formations

References

Bibliography

Further reading 

 
 
  
 
 
 
 

Geologic groups of Europe
Geologic formations of Austria
Geologic formations of Germany
Geologic formations of Slovakia
Upper Cretaceous Series of Europe
Campanian Stage
Maastrichtian Stage
Cretaceous–Paleogene boundary
Paleocene Series of Europe
Danian Stage
Selandian Stage
Thanetian Stage
Eocene Series of Europe
Ypresian Stage
Geology of the Alps
Limestone Alps
Northern Limestone Alps